Román Soto Vergara (1923 – 22 July 2016) was a Chilean football manager. He has been one of the four Chilean managers who have worked in Costa Rica along with Hugo Tassara, Constantino Mohor and Javier Mascaró.

Career
In his country of birth, Soto coached the city teams of both Antofagasta and Temuco as well as club Fanaloza from Penco. He also was the assistant of Isaac Mlynarz in Magallanes.

He moved abroad and led Ecuadorian club LDU Quito in the 1961 Campeonato Ecuatoriano de Fútbol.

In 1966, he coached Atlético Bucaramanga in the Campeonato Profesional of Colombia.

Other works
In addition to work as a football coach, he also was a football instructor at the INCUDE in the 1970s and a member of the FIFA football managers.

Always in Costa Rica, he worked as a football commentator in radio media.

Personal life
Soto made his home in Costa Rica and died on 22 July 2016 at the age of 93.

Honours
LDU Quito
 : 1961

References

1923 births
2016 deaths
Chilean football managers
Chilean expatriate football managers
L.D.U. Quito managers
Atlético Bucaramanga managers
C.S. Herediano managers
Categoría Primera A managers
Chilean expatriate sportspeople in Ecuador
Chilean expatriate sportspeople in Colombia
Chilean expatriate sportspeople in Costa Rica
Expatriate football managers in Ecuador
Expatriate football managers in Colombia
Expatriate football managers in Costa Rica
Naturalized citizens of Costa Rica
Chilean association football commentators
Date of birth missing
Place of birth missing